Albert Knowles (1 June 1871 – 1950) was an English footballer who played in the Football League for Blackburn Rovers.

References

1871 births
1950 deaths
English footballers
Association football goalkeepers
English Football League players
Clitheroe F.C. players
Blackburn Rovers F.C. players